My Only Love is a Philippine television drama series first aired 200708.

My Only Love may also refer to:
My Only Love (film), the English title of Hobbi al-Wahid, a 1960 Egyptian drama/romance film
 "My Only Love", a song by Roxy Music on the 1980 album Flesh and Blood
 "My Only Love", a song by Moby on the 2020 album All Visible Objects
 "My Only Love" (song), a song written by Jimmy Fortune and recorded in 1984 by The Statler Brothers

See also 
 Only Love (disambiguation)